Lodha Bellissimo is a twin residential skyscraper project located in  Mumbai, India developed by Lodha Group of Mumbai. Construction started in 2006 and was completed in 2012.

See also
List of tallest structures in the Indian subcontinent
List of tallest buildings in Mumbai
List of tallest buildings in India
Lodha Altamount
Lodha Group

References

External links
 Lodha Bellissimo
 Bellissimo in Emporis
 Lodha Bellissimo Owners Portal

Residential skyscrapers in Mumbai
Buildings and structures under construction in India